Sukma attack may refer to:

 2013 Naxal attack in Darbha valley
 2017 Sukma attack
 2018 Sukma attack
 2021 Sukma-Bijapur attack